Boo Saville (born 15 January 1980) is a contemporary artist. She lives and works in London.

Career 

Saville was born in Norwich. She graduated from Slade School of Fine Art in 2004, then worked at a makeshift studio in Pimlico in the front room of her friend Elisa Roche's apartment. Her sister is artist Jenny Saville and she also moonlights as a member of the band 'So Silage Crew'.

Saville is known mainly for her detailed drawings using Biros as her main material, her work focusing on the decomposition of the body after death.

She has exhibited widely in London and Europe. She received attention when her work was selected by Nicholas Forrest as Critics Choice at Saatchi Online. and had work exhibited in Black Dog- Yellow House, a group show curated by Rachel Howard.

Her work has been associated with New Gothic Art. and she runs a blog collecting images and quotes from the internet about death www.bonesanddust.blogspot.com

Boo Saville is represented by Davidson Gallery in New York, and TJ Boulting Gallery in London.

Solo exhibitions

2008:Laid Bare, Martin Summers Fine Art, London
2009: Ghost/Ghost Proof, Other Criteria, London
2009: Butter Sunk, Trolley Gallery, London

References

External links 
 Saville featured on Saatchi Online
 Saville featured on Art Net
 Saville on Martin Summers Fine Art
 16 Astonishingly Intricate Ballpoint Pen Art Creations

1980 births
Living people
Alumni of the Slade School of Fine Art
British contemporary painters
21st-century British women artists